Shi Tao (born 1 April 1992) is a Chinese former road and track cyclist. He competed in the team pursuit event at the 2013 UCI Track Cycling World Championships.

References

External links

1992 births
Living people
Chinese track cyclists
Chinese male cyclists
Place of birth missing (living people)
Asian Games medalists in cycling
Cyclists at the 2014 Asian Games
Asian Games gold medalists for China
Medalists at the 2014 Asian Games
20th-century Chinese people
21st-century Chinese people